Johnny Says Ho: The Christmas EP is an album by Johnny Goudie which was sent out as a Christmas gift to his fan club in 2001. It is composed of recordings from live acoustic radio appearances, cover songs, and original demos.

Track listing
"Already Here" (live on Radio with Jeff Klein)
"Dear Preudence" (Beatles cover)
"I am Falling"
"Why Can't You Just Fake It?"
"Cry Baby Cry" (Beatles cover)
"Upside Down and Pink" (live on radio)
"Ashes to Ashes" (David Bowie cover)
"Monkey"
"Crimson & Clover" (Tommy James and the Shondells cover)
"Already Here"

2001 albums
Johnny Goudie albums